Lieutenant-General Peregrine Lascelles (1685–1772), also spelt Lascells, was a British military officer from Yorkshire.

He served in the Spanish theatre of the War of the Spanish Succession, and spent most of the next thirty years on garrison duty in Scotland and England. During the 1745 Jacobite Rising, he fought at the Battle of Prestonpans in September 1745, when the British army was defeated in 15 minutes.

Although court-martialled, he was exonerated, and promoted Lieutenant-General, serving in North America until 1759. He retired in 1768 and died on 26 March 1772.

Family

The Lascelles family was spread across different towns in Yorkshire, including Northallerton, Durham, Whitby, York, Harewood House and Terrington but were also rooted in a wider network of Nonconformist mercantile interests, with branches in London, Ireland, New England and Barbados.

His grandfather, also Peregrine (1619-1658), was one of three brothers, the others being Francis (1612-1667) and Thomas (1624-1697); all of these supported Parliament during the 1639-1652 Wars of the Three Kingdoms, while Francis took part in the trial of Charles I.

His father Peregrine (died 1699), inherited land in Lythe, outside Whitby, and married Mary Wigginer, who came from a prominent Whitby merchant's family. Peregrine Lascelles was born in 1685 in the Staithside district; he does not appear to have married.

Career
A number of his relatives served in the military, including the engineer Thomas Lascelles (1670-1751), who became Surveyor-General of the Ordnance in 1742. In April 1706, Peregrine was commissioned into Lovelace's Regiment, a new unit raised for the War of the Spanish Succession. He transferred to Lepell's Regiment of Foot in 1708, when Lovelace was appointed Governor-general of New Jersey. 

Posted to Spain, he fought at Almanara, Zaragossa and Villaviciosa, where his unit suffered heavy casualties. Lepell, by then senior British officer in Catalonia, reported his infantry regiment suffered over 107 casualties, and only two squadrons of dragoons were fit for action. The regiment was disbanded in November 1712 in the run-up to the 1713 Peace of Utrecht.

Lascelles was placed on half-pay until 1715, when he was appointed Captain in Grants Regiment, a unit formed in response to the Jacobite rising. It did not see action, being used to garrison Edinburgh Castle, then on policing duties after the rising failed. In recognition of his service, Lascelles was made an honorary burgess of Glasgow, along with many others, including his relative Thomas.

Grants was disbanded in 1718 and his movements immediately following this remain unclear; in 1723, he was a captain in Churchill's Dragoons, which performed garrison duty in different parts of Britain, primarily the West Country. In 1733, he was made captain in the Guards, which under the practice known as double-ranking was the equivalent of Lieutenant-Colonel in line regiments.

As a result, in the expansion that followed the outbreak of the War of the Austrian Succession, in 1743 Lascelles was made as Colonel of the 47th Foot; raised in 1741, it was employed on the construction of a military road near Loch Lomond, part of a new route from Dumbarton to Inverary. The road was completed in May 1745, two months before Charles Stuart launched the 1745 Rising. After detaching two companies to garrison Edinburgh Castle, Lascelles and the rest of his regiment joined the field army commanded by Sir John Cope.

At the Battle of Prestonpans on 21 September, the Jacobites scattered Cope's army in less than 15 minutes; Lascelles fought his way out, but most of his regiment was captured. He was tried by a court-martial in 1746, along with Cope and Thomas Fowke, a former colleague from Lepells Regiment; all three were exonerated, although Cope never held field command again. 

Lascelles and his regiment were posted to Nova Scotia in 1750; conflict between British and French settlers resulted in a series of clashes known as Father Le Loutre's War, the most significant being the June 1755 Battle of Fort Beauséjour. He remained in North America for at least part of the Seven Years' War, the 47th forming part of the force commanded by James Wolfe that captured Louisbourg in 1758. He was promoted Lieutenant-General shortly afterwards, and the 47th then fought at the capture of Quebec in 1759, where Wolfe was killed, and Sainte-Foy in 1760, before returning to Britain when the war ended in 1763.

It is not clear when he ceased active service, since it was common to retain the position of Colonel, but delegate operational command; he formally resigned from the 47th Regiment in July 1768. He died on 26 March 1772, and was buried in St Mary's Church, Whitby, where his memorial can still be seen. His epitaph was supposedly composed by Doctor John Dealtry (1708-1773), a long-time friend from York, who named his eldest son Peregrine.

Notes

References

Sources
 
 
 
 
 
 
 
 
 
 
 
 
 
 
 
 
 

1685 births
1772 deaths
People from Whitby
Military personnel from Yorkshire
British Army lieutenant generals
10th Royal Hussars officers
Grenadier Guards officers
47th Regiment of Foot officers
British Army personnel of the Seven Years' War
People of the Jacobite rising of 1715
British Army personnel of the Jacobite rising of 1745
British Army personnel of the War of the Spanish Succession
British Army personnel of the French and Indian War
People of Father Le Loutre's War